= MyDriver =

International chauffeur company

myDriver
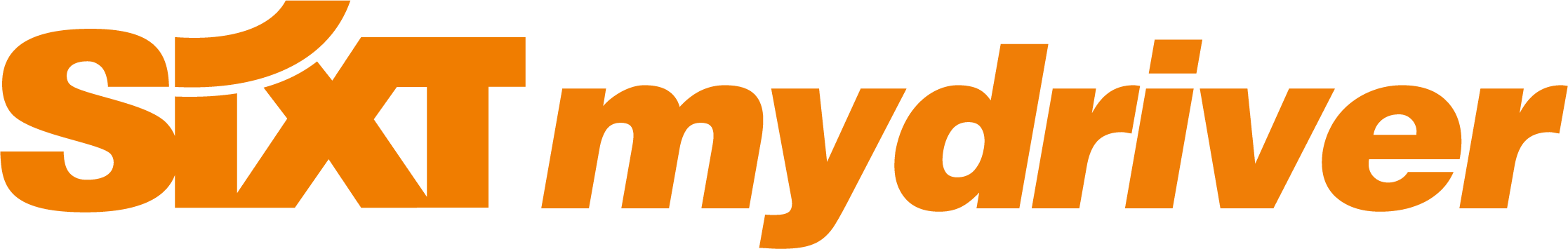
- Native name: Sixt Chauffeur Reservation Systems GmbH & Co. KG
- Type: Chauffeur
- Industry: Chauffeur Service
- Founded: 2012
- Founder: Alexander Sixt
- Headquarters: Hausvogteiplatz 2, 10117 Berlin, Deutschland, Berlin, Germany
- Area served: Germany Paris Antibes Belfort Bordeaux Cannes Lille Lyon Marseille Menton Nice Saint-Tropez Strasbourg Toulouse Rome MilanTurin Venice Florence Pisa Verona Vienna Innsbruck Salzburg Graz Linz Brussels Antwerp Ghent Leuven Prague Paris Monaco Amsterdam Rotterdam The Hague Bucharest Bratislava Barcelona Madrid Bilbao Valencia Mallorca Málaga Ankara Istanbul London Birmingham Manchester Liverpool Leeds Copenhagen Stockholm Adana Luxembourg San Sebastián Antalya Bucharest
- Key people: Konrad Thoma (CEO) , Johannes Boeinghoff (Managing Director)
- Number of employees: 100 (2016)
- Website: https://www.mydriver.com

myDriver is a chauffeur company that operates in more than 150 cities in 60 countries. mydriver is a subsidiary of Sixt Rent A Car and is part of the Sixt Chauffeured Services business unit.

== History ==
mydriver was founded in 2013 in Berlin, Germany by Carl Schuster, Andreas Goschler and Oliver Mickler under the company Sixt. The service launched in early 2013 in Munich, Düsseldorf, Frankfurt, Berlin, Hamburg, Hanover, Cologne, Leipzig, Bremen, Stuttgart, Nuremberg, and Dresden.

In 2014 mydriver expanded to other parts of Germany, Paris, and Vienna. In late 2015, myDriver expanded its services to France, Austria, and the Netherlands. The company began offering services in 2016 to Spain, the United Kingdom, Belgium, Italy, Monaco, Romania, the Czech Republic, Turkey, and the United States.

In 2017, myDriver, Sixt Chauffeur Service, and Sixt rides were consolidated into Sixt Chauffeured Services, combining their services and vehicle options onto a single platform.

== Structure ==
mydriver groups their cars into four categories: First class, Business class, Economy class, and Van. The company uses both staff and contracted drivers.
